Modern Colonization by Medical Intervention: U.S. Medicine in Puerto Rico is a 2013 nonfiction book by Nicole Trujillo-Pagán. The book details how the United States and its physicians used the medical treatment of Puerto Ricans, particularly jíbaros, to colonize and occupy Puerto Rico.

See also 
 Colonization of Puerto Rico by the United States
 Healthcare in Puerto Rico
 Public health in Puerto Rico

References 

2013 non-fiction books
Works about Puerto Rico
History of United States expansionism
History of Puerto Rico
Brill Publishers books